Jean Arcelin is a French and Swiss painter born in Paris in June 1962.
He studied at Charpentier, a licensed art history school at the Sorbonne, where he developed an interest in seventeenth- and eighteenth-century painting. His paintings incorporate elements of false realism and figurative art, as well as some elements of Baroque.

His pictorial compositions are simply the results of his imagination without any cinematographic aids, using principally the oil canvas technique called “alla prima”, keen to the original impressionist painters, which cancels the initial undercoated and glazed steps.
Landscapes edge with the urban sea, and combine with portraitist gesture. He takes corners of Paris, cafe chairs piled up in the angle of view of a monument, or the dressing room of a theatre, and portrays them empty of all human presence.
He participated in the Ebel sponsored Art and Culture in Basel and in Villa Schwob, Switzerland from 1990 to 1995 and exhibited in 1989, 1990 and 1999 at the Institut de France.

Recent exhibitions
Selected solo exhibitions

 Since 2006: Galerie 26 Place des Vosges, Paris.
 2013: Callanwolde Fine Arts Center, Atlanta, GA.
 Since 2012: Besharat Gallery, Barbizon.
 Since 2010: Besharat Gallery, Atlanta, GA.
 2010, 2011: Ariel Sibony Gallery, Place des Vosges, Paris.
 2010, 2011: Sibman Gallery, Place des Vosges, Paris.
 2010, 2015: Galerie Fert, Yvoire, France.

Selected group exhibitions

 2011, 2012, 2013: Art Palm Beach, West Palm Beach, FL.
 2010, 2011, 2012: The Affordable Art Fair (AAF), New York City.
 2011: Scope Basel, Switzerland.
 2011: ArtMRKT, San Francisco, CA.
 2011: Scope, New York City.
 2011: Lille Art Fair.
 2011: MIA Art Fair, Miami, FL.
 2010: The Red Dot, Miami, FL.
 2010: Art London, Chelsea.

Gallery

Notes and references

.

Bibliography
Jean Arcelin, peintre de l’instant et de l’instinct, texts by Séverine Plat-Monin, 156 pages. Editions des falaises, 2019. 
Jean Arcelin, Besharat Gallery editions, 2013. (63 pages)
 Catalogue for the exhibition Jean-Arcelin, impressions of Italy, preface by Lydia Harambourg. Galerie 26’s edition, 2009. 
 Monograph Mirage and conjuring. 96 pages, 57 colour reproductions. Galerie 26’s edition, 2008. 
 Catalogue for the exhibition Jean Arcelin, recent paintings, preface by Lydia Harambourg. Galerie 26’s edition, 2007. 
Jean Arcelin. Basel, Hardhof. Espace Art and Culture Ebel, 1990. Texts by Gérard Xuriguera. Editions Glasnost, Grandson, 1990.

External links

 

1962 births
20th-century French painters
20th-century French male artists
20th-century Swiss male artists
French male painters
21st-century French painters
21st-century French male artists
21st-century Swiss male artists
20th-century Swiss painters
Swiss male painters
21st-century Swiss painters
Living people
Painters from Paris
People from Payerne